"Can't Help but Wait" is the second single from the Trey Songz album Trey Day. The song is written by Johntá Austin, Mikkel S. Eriksen, and Tor Erik Hermansen. On the issue date of October 6, 2007, the single debuted on the US Billboard Hot 100 at number 99. American actor Jackie Long (ATL) appears in the video as the abusive boyfriend. "Can't Help but Wait" peaked within the top 20 of the US Billboard Hot 100, at number 14 the week ending December 22, 2007. The video was filmed in Toronto, Ontario. The song was nominated for Best Male R&B Vocal Performance at the 2009 Grammy Awards.

Background and composition

The duo of producers Stargate originally created the song's instrumental for a song titled "If", made for Beyonce's 2006 album B'Day, with lyrics written by Ne-Yo. Uploads of Ne-Yo's "If" demo can be found on YouTube.

"Can't Help But Wait" was fully written by Johntá Austin. The song was sent for United States rhythmic contemporary airplay on August 7, 2007 by Songbook and Atlantic Records. Elsewhere, "Can't Help But Wait" was released as a one-track digital download by WEA International on August 28, 2007. Additionally, Atlantic Records released a CD single on March 17, 2008 in the United Kingdom.

According to the sheet music published by Sony/ATV Music Publishing, "Can't Help But Wait" is an R&B song set in common time with a moderate R&B tempo of 95 beats per minute. It is written in the key of G minor, and follows the chord progression  of Emaj7–Cm9–Gm9–Gm, and Songz' voice in the song spans from F4 to G5. "Can't Help But Wait" is about Songz wanting a woman who is mistreated by her boyfriend; he attempts to persuade the woman to leave her partner. Throughout the song, Songz gives examples of how women can be treated courteously. A remix of "Can't Help But Wait" features Lil Wayne.

Critical reception
"Can't Help But Wait" was selected as one of Trey Day best tracks in Allmusic's review of the album. A reviewer for Billboard lauded the songwriting and production of the number, and praised the maturity that Songz showed on the tune. Writing for About.com Mark Edward Nero commended Songz' vocal effort on "Can't Help But Wait", and the song's "nice balance of sensitivity and swagger". It was ranked at number twenty-three on MTV News' list of the 27 Essential R&B Songs of 2007. "Can't Help But Wait" was nominated in the Best Male R&B Vocal Performance category at the 2009 Grammy Awards, but lost to Ne-Yo's "Miss Independent".

Chart performance
"Can't Help But Wait" entered the US Hot R&B/Hip-Hop Songs at number seventy-two on the chart of August 25, 2007. On December 15, 2007 it reached its peak position of number two, where it remained the following week. During both weeks "Can't Help But Wait" was at number two, Alicia Keys' "No One" topped the chart. "Can't Help But Wait" remained on the R&B/Hip-Hop Songs for thirty-two weeks.
The song debuted at number ninety-nine on the Billboard Hot 100 on the issue dated October 6, 2007. "Can't Help But Wait" rose to number fourteen on the Hot 100 on December 22, 2007. achieved during its second week at number two on the R&B/Hip-Hop Songs. The song fell off the Hot 100 in March 2008, having spent twenty-four weeks on the chart. "Can't Help But Wait" appeared on the Pop 100 and Rhythmic Top 40, and reached numbers seventy-four and six, respectively. "Can't Help But Wait" made its debut on the UK Singles Chart at number 163 on March 29, 2008; it peaked at number 115.

Track listing
CD single
"Can't Help But Wait"
"Can't Help But Wait"

Charts

Weekly charts

Year-end charts

Certifications

Radio and release history

References

External links

2008 singles
2007 singles
Song recordings produced by Stargate (record producers)
Trey Songz songs
Songs written by Johntá Austin
Songs written by Tor Erik Hermansen
Songs written by Mikkel Storleer Eriksen
2007 songs